The Green Archer is the 12th serial released by Columbia Pictures. It was based on Edgar Wallace's 1923 novel The Green Archer, which had previously been adapted into the silent serial of the same name in 1925 by Pathé Exchange.

Plot
The struggle over the Bellamy estate ends with Michael Bellamy accused of murder and killed on the way to prison, while his brother, Abel Bellamy, takes control of the estate for his own nefarious plans. Bellamy is using Garr Castle as a base for his jewelry-theft ring, and he kidnaps his brother's wife to keep things quiet. Insurance investigator Spike Holland enters the case, and Bellamy continually dispatches his resident gang to do away with him. Detective Thompson, representing the law, is seldom of any help. Meanwhile, the estate's fabled "Green Archer", a masked, leotard-clad marksman, steals silently through Garr Castle and the estate grounds, confounding the enemy forces.

This serial is an example of a fifteen-episode production that could have been rented for a twelve-episode run, as three episodes use an entirely self-contained subplot concerning the theft of a synthetic radium formula.

Cast
 Victor Jory as Spike Holland
 Iris Meredith as Valerie Howett
 James Craven as Abel Bellamy
 Robert Fiske as Savini 
 Dorothy Fay as Elaine Bellamy
 Forrest Taylor as Parker Howett
 Jack Ingram as Brad - Henchman 
 Joseph W. Girard as Inspector Ross 
 Fred Kelsey as Capt. Thompson
 Kit Guard as Dinky Stone - Henchman / Radio Man

Chapter titles
 Prison Bars Beckon
 The Face at the Window
 The Devil's Dictograph
 Vanishing Jewels
 The Fatal Spark
 The Necklace of Treachery
 The Secret Passage
 Garr Castle is Robbed
 Mirror of Treachery
 The Dagger that Failed
 The Flaming Arrow
 The Devil Dogs
 The Deceiving Microphone
 End of Hope
 The Green Archer Exposed

Production
The script was written by Morgan B. Cox, John Cutting, and Jesse A. Duffy. Director James W. Horne also contributed to the script, which often emphasizes tongue-in-cheek comedy. Under Horne's direction, the heroes and villains exaggerate the melodrama — James Craven is enjoyably florid as the villain, and his henchmen also play for laughs, with comedian Fred Kelsey cast as a very dumb detective. In one scene some of the crooks are shown playing tiddlywinks.

The serial was released in the US on October 1, 1940, and in Latin America in March 1941 under the title El Arquero Verde (in English with Spanish subtitles). The Green Archer was one of 1940's best remembered serials.

See also
 List of American films of 1940
 List of film serials by year
 List of film serials by studio
 The Green Archer (1961)

References

External links
 
 

1940 films
1940s English-language films
American black-and-white films
American detective films
Columbia Pictures film serials
Films based on British novels
Films based on works by Edgar Wallace
Films directed by James W. Horne
American crime films
1940 crime films
1940s American films